Amyna bullula, the hook-tipped amyna moth, is a species of moth in the family Noctuidae (the owlet moths). It is found in North America.

The MONA or Hodges number for Amyna bullula is 9069.

Subspecies
These two subspecies belong to the species Amyna bullula:
 Amyna bullula bullula
 Amyna bullula concolorata Barnes & Benjamin, 1924

References

Further reading

 
 
 

Bagisarinae
Articles created by Qbugbot
Moths described in 1873